Deluxe is a French band formed in 2007 in Aix-en-Provence.

Biography
Deluxe was discovered by the band Chinese Man in 2007 in Aix-en-Provence, where they were performing on public streets.  Deluxe started as 3 childhood friends who were passionate about music, and eventually became a group of five after adding Soubri and Pepe to the lineup in 2007.  In December 2010 the band met a singer/rapper named Liliboy with whom they collaborated, and eventually added to the band's lineup full-time.  With the addition of Liliboy, the band became a more successful live act in France and other nearby European countries. The band lists their influences as "Beat Assailant, The Roots, General Elektriks, Cannonball Adderley, Matthieu Chedid, Gainsbourg and many more". Their live performances are characterized by using many different instruments and working each one into the mix. "Rhodes, guitar, bass, horns, you can expect a really complete live music experience when you see us on stage."

They have moustaches for a symbol—all the boys have moustaches and Liliboy usually wears a moustache-shaped skirt.

Band members
Current members
Liliboy – vocals (2010–present)
Kaya – bass, MPC (2007–present)
Kilo – drums, turntables (2007–present)
Pietre – guitar, keyboards (2007–present)
Soubri – miscellaneous percussion, MPC MIDI (2007–present)
Pepe – saxophone, trumpet, keyboards (2007–present)

Discography

Studio albums
 The Deluxe Family Show (Chinese Man Records, 2013)
 Stachelight (Chinese Man Records, 2016)
 Boys & Girl (NANANA Production, 2019)
 Moustache Gracias (Polydor, 2022)

EPs
 Polishing Peanuts (Chinese Man Records, 2011)
 Daniel (Chinese Man Records, 2012)

References

External links
 

Musical groups established in 2007
Electro swing musicians
French electronic music groups